The Serenity of Suffering is the twelfth studio album by American nu metal band Korn. It was released on October 21, 2016. According to guitarist Brian Welch, it is "heavier than anyone's heard us in a long time" and it contains their most intense vocals and music in recent times.

Background
The band began working on their follow up to The Paradigm Shift in 2015, with Head claiming that it would be "heavier than anyone's heard [us] in a long time". It's the first album to feature significant songwriting contributions from Head since he rejoined the band in 2013. The song "Take Me" was originally written by Jonathan Davis for his debut solo album, but after hearing it, the rest of Korn re-wrote the track and decided to include it on The Serenity of Suffering.

The artwork includes the stuffed toy from Korn's fourth album, Issues, and was created by Ron English.

Commercial performance 
The Serenity of Suffering debuted at number 4 on the US Billboard 200 with 57,000 units, 55,000 of which were pure album sales. As of December 2017, the album has sold 133,000 copies in the US.

Reception 

The Serenity of Suffering received an approval rating of 67/100 on review aggregator website Metacritic based on nine reviews, indicating a "generally favorable" response from critics.

AllMusic wrote: "Without pandering to career-peak nostalgia, Korn deftly execute all the hallmarks that have come to define their sound", calling it "one of their best albums". Metal Hammer wrote: "The Serenity of Suffering is like a selection box of Korn's defining moments."

A less favorable review came from Rolling Stone, writing: "Suffering is heavy enough to stand proudly in the Korn kanon, but not daring enough to be much else."

Track listing

Personnel 

Korn
 Jonathan Davis – lead vocals
 James "Munky" Shaffer – rhythm and lead guitars, backing vocals
 Brian "Head" Welch – lead and rhythm guitars, backing vocals
 Reginald "Fieldy" Arvizu – bass
 Ray Luzier – drums

Additional musicians
 Corey Taylor – guest vocals on "A Different World"
 Zac Baird – keyboards on "Take Me"
 Jules Venturini – programming
 Nick "Sluggo" Suddarth – programming
 Rick Norris – additional programming
 C-Minus – turntables on "Insane", "A Different World", "Next in Line", and "Calling Me Too Soon"

Production
 Nick Raskulinecz – producer
 Josh Wilbur – mixing, mastering
 Nathan Yarborough – engineering
 Chris Collier – additional engineering
 Paul Suarez – assistant mix engineering
 Justin Warfield – additional vocal arrangement
 Dave Rath - A&R
 Ron English – illustrations
 Virgilio Tzaj – art direction, design

Charts

Weekly charts

Year-end charts

References

External links 
 The Serenity of Suffering at Korn.com

2016 albums
Korn albums
Roadrunner Records albums
Albums produced by Nick Raskulinecz